Ashleigh Gordon Pilbrow (1 July 1912 – 2 May 1995) was an English Track and field athlete who competed for Great Britain in the 1936 Summer Olympics.

He was born in Barnet and died in Beaulieu, Hampshire. He studied at Queen's College, Oxford.

In 1936 he was eliminated in the first round of the Olympic 110 metre hurdles event.

At the 1934 British Empire Games he won the bronze medal in the 120 yards hurdles competition. In the 440 yards hurdles contest he finished sixth.

References

sports-reference.com

1912 births
1995 deaths
People from Chipping Barnet
English male hurdlers
Olympic athletes of Great Britain
Athletes (track and field) at the 1936 Summer Olympics
Commonwealth Games bronze medallists for England
Commonwealth Games medallists in athletics
Athletes (track and field) at the 1934 British Empire Games
Alumni of The Queen's College, Oxford
Medallists at the 1934 British Empire Games